The MPT is a modular rifle family designed by MKEK and produced by MKEK, Sarsılmaz Arms and Kalekalıp to meet the demands of the Turkish Armed Forces and to replace its aging rifles such as the Heckler & Koch G3 and Heckler & Koch HK33 due to most of them being near the end of their service life. The MPT was designed for robust high altitude, all weather combat, capable of functioning in extreme hot and cold weather. The MKEK MPT is a rifle intended to take abuse and extreme mistreatment and still maintain high accuracy and reliability in order to survive in true battle environments.

It made its first public appearance at the Eurosatory 2014, ADEX 2014 and the MSPO 2014 events.

History
After the first prototypes were built in 2008 as the Mehmetçik-1 in 5.56×45mm NATO, the rifle received negative feedback from Turkish soldiers testing it who reported that they preferred the 7.62×51mm NATO round which has far greater stopping power and range similar to those of the existing G3 service rifles. The proposed Mehmetcik-1 was therefore cancelled after the first prototype and engineers started the redesign process.

The first batch of 200 MPT-76s were delivered on 18 May 2014 and received positive feedback. The rifle was reported to be extremely accurate, reliable, but was outmatched by the G3 in all categories. The Turkish Army plans to gradually phase out its G3 and to make the MPT-76 its main service rifle. Azerbaijan plans to produce parts of the rifle in cooperation with Turkey.

Serial production began in 2015. The initial phase of the project will see a total of 35,014 MPT-76s being produced in two tranches. The first tranche of the initial phase, consisting of 20,000 rifles was contracted to the state-owned company Machines and Chemical Industries Board (MKEK) in June 2015. The second tranche, consisting of 15,014 rifles, was contracted with local company Kalekalip in December 2015.

The first batch of rifles was ready for delivery to the Turkish military in January 2017. Approximately 25,000 MPT-76s have been built by December 2018 and there is 350,000+ firm order for the rifle in 2019.

Design
The design was based on the AR-15, but the gas piston system was influenced by the HK417 It has a Picatinny rail system and mounting options for an under-barrel shotgun and grenade launcher. The MPT-76 posses some ergonomic deviations from what would be considered traditional AR-10 style rifles: the HK417. inspired buttstock must be rotated  counter-clockwise about 30 degrees, to adjust the length of pull. It also possesses an angled foregrip-style plastic mount that bridges the transition between the lower receiver and the picatinny handguard. It must be removed for disassembly. The charging handle also possesses the retaining latch on the right side of the weapon, not the left, which is typical of most stoner-derived weapon systems.

Variants
The following variants are in production:

 Battle Rifle with 16-inch barrel using 7.62×51mm NATO.
 Carbine with 12-inch barrel using 5.56×45mm NATO. 
 Designated Marksman's Rifle with 20-inch barrel using 7.62×51mm NATO.

MPT-55
In May 2017, MKEK introduced the MPT-55 of the MPT, which is chambered in 5.56×45mm. Turkey plans to obtain 20,000 of the smaller-caliber rifles to replace license-produced HK416s within special forces.

KNT-76
The KNT (Keskin Nişancı Tüfeği, English: Sniper Rifle, lit. "Sharp Shooter Rifle") is the DMR version of the MPT series. KNT-76 is produced in Kırıkkale Arms Factory like the MPT-76. The rifle with the same "Gas Operated Rotary Bolt Action" mechanism can fire semi-automatically. The MPT-76 can fire fully automatic and semi-automatic. Trigger sensitivity in the KNT is reduced by five Newtons which allows the trigger to move with less pressure. This drop prevents the involuntary movement of the barrel due to trigger movement. The KNT-76 weighs 500 grams heavier while the magazine capacity remains the same. The effective range increased from 600 meters to 800 meters thanks to the barrel extending from 406 mm to 508 mm. MOA is reduced to 1.5 MOA in KNT-76 as it was 4 MOA with the MPT-76.

KAAN-717

KAAN-717 is the carbine version of the MPT series, chambered in 7.62x51 NATO. Designed for the Special Forces, it uses a short-stroke action. KAAN-717 also comes with a different stock with cheek rest.

Users

: 30 MPT-76s and 30 MPT-55s
 : Around 2,500 MPT-76s delivered.
 
 : A total of 450 rifles were delivered to Somalia, which is dealing with an insurgency. Used by Gorgor (Eagle) commandos
 : 66,000 MPT-76 and MPT-55s as of 2019

Potential users
 
: Expressed interest in fully adopting the rifle for military service.

See also
 List of battle rifles

References

5.56 mm assault rifles
7.62×51mm NATO battle rifles
Rifles of Turkey
Turkish inventions
Modular firearms
ArmaLite AR-10 derivatives
Weapons and ammunition introduced in 2014